Batrachedra acrodeta is a moth in the family Batrachedridae. It is found on Samoa.

References

Natural History Museum Lepidoptera generic names catalog

Batrachedridae
Moths of Oceania
Moths described in 1927